The Ashdod derby is the football match between Hapoel Ashdod and Maccabi Ironi Ashdod both from Ashdod, Israel. The first derby was played on 13 January 1962.

Statistics
As of 10 January 2020

External links
Her city: Ironi Ashdod 4:1 Hapoel Ashdod (In Hebrew)

Football derbies in Israel
Maccabi Ironi Ashdod F.C.
Hapoel Ashdod F.C.
Sport in Ashdod